A broadaxe is a large (broad)-headed axe. There are two categories of cutting edge on broadaxes, both are used for shaping logs by hewing. On one type, one side is flat, and the other side beveled, a basilled edge, also called a side axe, single bevel, or chisle-edged axe. On the other type, both sides are beveled, sometimes called a double bevel axe, which produces a scalloped cut.

On the basilled broadaxe the handle may curve away from the flat side to allow an optimal stance by the hewer in relation to the hewn surface. The flat blade is to make the surface flat but can only be worked from one direction and is right-handed or left-handed. The double bevel axe has a straight handle and can be swung with either side against the wood. A double beveled broad axe can be used for chopping or notching as well as hewing. When used for hewing, notches are chopped in the side of the log down to a marked line, a process called scoring. The pieces of wood between these notches are removed with an axe, a process called joggling, and then the remaining wood is hewn to the line.

History 
Broad axes have been used since ancient times until the end of the 19th century in Europe and North America. Broadaxes were commonly used in manufacture of square timbers for wooden shipbuilding, log building, timber framing, and railroad ties sometimes called axe ties. Some broad axes are of a shape where part of the axe is called a beard so the axe is called a long-bearded axe.

Modern uses 
Since the introduction of sawmills and modern power tools, the use of this tool is now uncommon in manufacturing but still used in restoration carpentry or undeveloped regions.

Gallery

See also

 Battle axe

References

Axes
Green woodworking tools
Timber preparation
Woodworking hand tools

da:Økse#Bredbil